Manda II is a mountain of the Garhwal Himalaya in Uttarakhand India also called Manda south. It is joint 71st highest located entirely within the Uttrakhand. Nanda Devi, is the highest mountain in this category. It lies  NE of Jogin II . Its nearest higher neighbor is Bhrigupanth .

Gangotri National Park
The entire surrounding area are protected within the  Gangotri National Park, one of the largest conservation area in India. The Gangotri National Park is home to several world-class treks, including Gangotri Gomukh Tapoban Nandanvan, Kerdarnath Vasuki tal trek, Har ki dun valley trek,  Badrinath to Satopanth tal trek, Gangotri to Kedartal trek, Gangotri to Badrinath trek via Kalindi khal and many more.

Climbing history

In 1982 an American expedition, led by Mark Udall had the privilege of first ascent of Manda II through the South Ridge.

A group of climbers from Junipers, a climbing club of Calcutta decided to attempt Manda II from the east. The team led by Avijit Das, comprised Arnab Banerjee, Arka Ghosh, Kaushik Pal, RK Gambhisana, Thapa (HAP), Dil (HAP), and Dharmi (cook). On June 21 four members reached the summit around 4: 00 p.m. Fixing a total of 760 meters rope below the summit ridge. This is only the second summit of this peak and first Indian summit.

Neighboring and subsidiary peaks
neighboring or subsidiary peaks of Manda II:
 Thalay Sagar: 
 Meru Peak: 
 Manda III: 
 Shivling: 
 Gangotri I: 
 Gangotri II: 
 Gangotri III: 
 Jogin II:

Glaciers and rivers
On the western side lies Kedar Bamak and on the eastern side lies Bhrigupanth Bamak. Kedar Ganga emerges from Kedar bamak and joins Bhagirathi River near Gangotri. Bhrigupanth Bamak drain down to Bhagirathi River near Bhojwas. Bhagirathi joins the Alaknanda River the other main tributaries of river Ganga at Dev Prayag and called Ganga there after.

See also

 List of Himalayan peaks of Uttarakhand

References

Mountains of Uttarakhand
Six-thousanders of the Himalayas
Geography of Chamoli district